Tami Lancut Leibovitz is an Israeli consultant and author on matters of etiquette and personal image presentation.

Career
Lancut Leibovitz worked as an interior decorator. In 1979 her etiquette career started with mentoring from  who had been in charge of manners training for the Israeli Foreign Ministry.

Since 1985 Lancut Leibovitz is the president of the Institute for Personal Image, Manners, & International Etiquette. The institute provides consultation services on etiquette for Israeli executives and politicians.

Lancut Leibovitz developed what she calls the International Business Language (IBL) Code. This provides advice on how to take into account different cultures and geographical locations when doing business or conducting political campaigns. The IBL code also contains hospitality protocols and a code of services which Leibovitz recommends for use in hotels, restaurants and event managers while hosting state officials and key figures.

She is the  president of the Israeli Confrérie de la Chaîne des Rôtisseurs.

Selected publications

References

External links 
 
 

Living people
Etiquette writers
20th-century Israeli women writers
20th-century Israeli writers
21st-century Israeli women writers
21st-century Israeli writers
Year of birth missing (living people)